Locust is a pejorative term derived from the German word , which German politician Franz Müntefering (from the social democratic SPD party) created in the context of describing private investors, private equity funds and investment banks. The term has been popularized and is continually used in discussions critical to capitalism in Germany.

Origin 
In 2004 Franz Müntefering demanded that his party take a critical position towards certain practices of private equity firms. In a speech in November 2004, he first associated private financial investors with locusts:

This metaphor was repeated several times by both official pamphlets of the SPD and by German media.

Originally, none of the companies were named specifically. However, in 2005, the online news magazine stern.de published an article with a list of companies, namely Apax, BC Partners, Carlyle Group, Advent International, Permira, Blackstone Group, CVC Capital Partners, Saban Capital Group, KKR, WCM, and Goldman Sachs.

In 2005 former US Secretary of Treasury John W. Snow criticized the debate and commented "I do not think in these terms.".

The stock exchange of Düsseldorf made Locust the "faux-pas word" of 2005.

While remaining a mostly German phenomenon, "locust" has increasingly been quoted in English and American media, such as in the New York Times, the International Herald Tribune
, and most recently in the FT and The Economist.

References 

Political neologisms